The New Jersey and New York Railroad (NJ&NY) was a railroad company that operated north from Rutherford, New Jersey, to Haverstraw, New York beginning in the mid-to-late 19th century.

History 

The line was originally chartered as the Hackensack and New York Railroad (H&NY) in 1856. The H&NY would eventually run from Rutherford to Hackensack, New Jersey. In 1866 under the leadership of David P. Patterson the company was rechartered as the Hackensack and New York Extension Railroad and it extended its line north of Hackensack. It later reorganized as the New Jersey and New York Railroad. The line reached the town of Hillsdale, New Jersey, by 1870, the village of West Haverstraw by 1873, and the village of Haverstraw by 1887. The NJ&NY was in turn leased for 99 years by the Erie Railroad in 1896. The NJ&NY continued to exist as an Erie subsidiary until the 1960 merger that created the Erie Lackawanna Railroad. In 1976 the Erie Lackawanna was merged with several other railroads to create Conrail. In 1983, after several years under operation by Conrail, operations of the Pascack Valley Line were transferred to New Jersey Transit Rail Operations. The segments of the two former railroad lines in New York – north of Spring Valley to Haverstraw and north of Nanuet to New City – are no longer in service.

In 1956, NJ&NY reported 4.4 million net ton-miles of revenue freight and 21 million passenger-miles on 39 miles of railroad.

Stations
A typical NJ&NY station in the 1900s or 1910s had a gable or hip roof and often had board and batten siding.
The larger and more elaborate station at Hillsdale served as the company headquarters and was
built in a mixture of the Second Empire and Stick-Eastlake architectural styles.
Early photographs of stations along the NJ&NY line include:

References

External links

 A system map at: 

Defunct New York (state) railroads
Defunct New Jersey railroads
Transportation in Bergen County, New Jersey
Transportation in Rockland County, New York
Predecessors of the Erie Railroad
Railway companies established in 1880
Railway companies disestablished in 1896
Railway companies disestablished in 1967
Former Class I railroads in the United States
American companies established in 1880
Rail lines in Rockland County, New York